Dimitar Hristov Marashliev (31 August 1947 – 12 July 2018) was a Bulgarian football forward who played for Bulgaria in the 1970 FIFA World Cup. He also played for CSKA Sofia.

Career
Born in Harmanli, Marashliev began his football career playing for hometown club Hebros at the age of 13. He spent three years at the club before moving to Maritsa Plovdiv in 1963. Three years later, Marashliev made his A Group debut with Spartak Plovdiv, appearing in 6 league matches and scoring 2 times.

In October 1966, Marashliev joined CSKA Sofia. In his ten years at the club, he won six A Group titles and four Bulgarian Cups. Marashliev scored a total of 4 goals in three Bulgarian Cup finals – in 1969 (one goal against Levski Sofia), 1972 (two goals against Slavia Sofia) and 1974 (one goal against Levski Sofia).

After leaving CSKA at the end of the 1975–76 season, Marashliev joined Cherno More Varna, scoring 8 goals in the B Group. He retired from competitive football at the end of the 1976–77 season, at the age of 30.

Honours

Club
CSKA Sofia
 A Group (6): 1968–69, 1970–71, 1971–72, 1972–73, 1974–75, 1975–76
 Bulgarian Cup (4): 1969, 1972, 1973, 1974

References

External links
FIFA profile

1947 births
2018 deaths
Bulgarian footballers
Bulgaria international footballers
Association football forwards
FC Maritsa Plovdiv players
FC Spartak Plovdiv players
PFC CSKA Sofia players
PFC Cherno More Varna players
First Professional Football League (Bulgaria) players
1970 FIFA World Cup players
People from Harmanli
Sportspeople from Haskovo Province